The external sector is the portion of a country's economy that interacts with the economies of other countries. In the goods market, the external sector involves exports and imports. In the financial market it involves capital flows.

Economic features related to the external sector include: 
Some of these have some political industries as part of the sector  move to the next 5 pages to see
Balance of payments
Current account
Capital account 
Foreign direct investment
External debt
Exchange rate
Foreign-exchange reserves
International investment position

References

International macroeconomics